The AeroVironment RQ-11 Raven is a small hand-launched remote-controlled unmanned aerial vehicle (or SUAV) developed for the United States military, but now adopted by the military forces of many other countries.

The RQ-11 Raven was originally introduced as the FQM-151 in 1999, but in 2002 developed into its current form, resembling an enlarged FAI class F1C free flight model aircraft in general appearance. The craft is launched by hand and powered by a pusher configuration electric motor. The plane can fly up to 10 km at altitudes of approximately 150 m above ground level, and over 4,500 m above mean sea level, at flying speeds of 45–100 km/h. The U.S. Army deploys the Raven at company-level.

Design and development
The Raven RQ-11B UAS  is manufactured by AeroVironment. It was the winner of the US Army's SUAV program in 2005, and went into Full-Rate Production (FRP) in 2006. Shortly afterwards, it was also adopted by the US Marines, and the US Air Force for their ongoing FPASS Program. It has also been adopted by the military forces of many other countries (see below). More than 19,000 Raven airframes have been delivered to customers worldwide to date. A new Digital Data Link-enabled version of Raven now in production for US Forces and allies has improved endurance, among many other improvements.

The Raven can be either remotely controlled from the ground station or fly completely autonomous missions using GPS waypoint navigation. The UA can be ordered to immediately return to its launch point by pressing a single command button. Standard mission payloads include CCD color video cameras and an infrared night vision camera.

The RQ-11B Raven UA weighs about 1.9 kg (4.2 lb), has a flight endurance of 60–90 minutes and an effective operational radius of approximately 10 km (6.2 miles).

The RQ-11B Raven UA is launched by hand, thrown into the air like a free flight model airplane. The Raven lands itself by auto-piloting to a pre-defined landing point and then performing a 45° slope (1 foot down for every 1 foot forward) controlled "Autoland" descent. The UAS can provide day or night aerial intelligence, surveillance, target acquisition, and reconnaissance.

In mid-2015, the US Marine Corps tested Harris Corporation's Small Secure Data Link (SSDL), a radio device that fits onto a Raven's nose to provide beyond line-of-sight communications for Marines down to squad level. Acting as communications nodes for ground forces has become an important function for UASs, but has been restricted to larger platforms like the RQ-4 Global Hawk or RQ-21 Blackjack. Being certified for 'Secret' classification and at just  (measuring 3 in × 5.3 in × 1.6 in) and weighing , the Harris SSDL allows the small Raven UAS to extend communications for troops in the field.

In August 2015 selected units began receiving upgrades to their Raven sensors. The Raven Gimbal is a rotating camera with a 360-degree gimbal, which replaces the fixed camera that required maneuvering the aircraft to observe. The new camera can be switched between day and night settings without landing and swapping sensors. In August 2017 Belgium bought 32 Raven-drones, Luxembourg: 16.

Variants
 RQ-11A Raven A (no longer in production)
 RQ-11B Raven B
 CU-173 Raven B - version for the Canadian Armed Forces
 Solar Raven – In November 2012, the Air Force Research Laboratory integrated  flexible solar panels into the Raven platform's wing sections using a clear, protective plastic film and an adhesive to augment the existing battery power system, increasing endurance by 60%. Future improvements include improving the durability of the solar panels and reducing their weight. Integration work is also being conducted on the AeroVironment Wasp and the RQ-20 Puma.

Operators

The Raven is used by the United States Army, Air Force, Marine Corps, and Special Operations Command. Additionally, foreign customers include Australia, Estonia, Italy, Denmark, Spain and Czech Republic. As of early 2012, over 19,000 airframes have already been shipped, making it the most widely adopted UAV system in the world today.

The British forces in Iraq used Raven equipment. The Royal Danish Army acquired 12 Raven systems in September 2007; three systems will be delivered to the Huntsmen Corps, while the remainder will be deployed with soldiers from the Artillery Training Center. A 2010 documentary film, Armadillo, shows Danish forces deploying a Raven in operations around FOB Armadillo in the Helmand province of Afghanistan. The drone also makes an appearance being used by the SEAL operators in the 2012 film Act of Valor.

The Netherlands MoD has acquired 72 operational RQ-11B systems with a total value of $23.74 million for use within Army reconnaissance units, its Marine Corps and its Special Forces (KCT). At the turn of the year 2009 to 2010 the systems were deployed above the village Veen, as part of the Intensification of Civil-Military Cooperation. In 2012 and 2013 the Raven was loaned by the Defense department to the police department of Almere to combat burglary.

In April 2011, the U.S. announced that it would be supplying 85 Raven B systems to the Pakistan Army.

In June 2011, the U.S. announced $145.4 million in proposed aid for anti-terror efforts in north and east Africa, including four Raven systems to be used by forces from Uganda and Burundi as part of the ongoing African Union peacekeeping mission in Somalia. The US has also announced its intent to supply an unspecified number of Ravens to the Ukrainian armed forces. Ukrainian operators criticized the Raven's analog control system that made them vulnerable to jamming and hacking by sophisticated Russian-backed separatists.

Iran has claimed it has captured two RQ-11, one "in Shahrivar 1390 (August 21 – September 19, 2011) and the other one in Aban (October 22 – November 20, 2012)". It also indicated that "much of the data of these drones has been decoded", but did not indicate whether the drone has been duplicated, as has been done with the RQ-170 and the Boeing Insitu ScanEagle.

In January 2023, the U.S. Marine Corps revealed they had retired the RQ-11B Raven SUAS in favor of the FLIR Systems R80 SkyRaider, a VTOL UAV that is easier to launch and recover and can provide a hover-and-stare surveillance capability.

Current operators

Australian Armed Forces

Belgian Armed Forces

Bulgarian Armed Forces 

Canadian Armed Forces

Colombian Armed Forces

Public Force of Costa Rica

Czech Armed Forces

Estonian Armed Forces

Hungarian Armed Forces

Iraqi Armed Forces

Italian Armed Forces

Kenyan Armed Forces

Lebanese Armed Forces: 12 systems

Lithuanian Armed Forces

Luxembourg Armed Forces  

Macedonian Armed Forces

Dutch Armed Forces

Norwegian Armed Forces

Pakistan Army

Armed Forces of the Philippines

Portuguese Armed Forces

Romanian Armed Forces

Saudi Arabian Armed Forces

Slovak Armed Forces

Spanish Armed Forces

Thai Armed Forces

Ugandan Armed Forces
 
Ukrainian Armed Forces: 72 systems

British Armed Forces
 
U.S. Armed Forces: 1,798 systems

Uzbek Armed Forces

Yemeni Armed Forces

Specifications
 Wing Span: 4.5 ft (1,372 mm)
 Length: 3 ft (915 mm)
 Weight: 4.2 lb (1,906 g)
 Engine: Aveox 27/26/7-AV electric motor
 Cruising speed: approx. 
 Range: 6.2 miles (10 km)
 Endurance: approx. 60–90 min

See also

References
Notes

Bibliography

External links

 RQ-11 Raven Details on Globalsecurity.org
 Newsweeks Interactive Graphic. Raven: The Tiniest Drone
 Video of RQ-11 Raven launch from building in Najaf, Iraq
 Danish page about Raven
 AeroVironment, Inc.
 RQ11B Simulator

Q-11 Raven
2000s United States military reconnaissance aircraft
Unmanned military aircraft of the United States
Single-engined pusher aircraft
Electric aircraft
Parasol-wing aircraft